Hammerbrook is an elevated railway station on the Harburg S-Bahn line, served by the city trains of Hamburg S-Bahn. The railway station is located in Hammerbrook, Hamburg-Mitte, Hamburg, Germany.

History 
The station was opened on 23 September 1983 to connect Harburg and other districts South of the Elbe River − home of more than half a million people − with Hamburg's inner city. Since then, and also thanks to the station, Hammerbrook developed into a commercial district: the "City Süd".

Layout 
The elevated station consists of an island platform with 2 side tracks. The station is fully accessible for handicapped persons since 2013. There are two entrances to the station on Hammerbrookstraße, one near Mittelkanal, the other near Südkanal.

Services

Trains 
The rapid transit trains of the lines S3 and S31 of the Hamburg S-Bahn are calling the station, connecting the town Pinneberg in Schleswig-Holstein and the city of Stade, Lower Saxony, with Hamburg.

Facilities 
No personnel are attending the station, but there are emergency and information telephones, and ticket machines.

Gallery

See also 

 List of Hamburg S-Bahn stations
 Hamburger Verkehrsverbund (HVV)

References

External links

Hamburg S-Bahn stations in Hamburg
Buildings and structures in Hamburg-Mitte
Hamburg Hammerbrook
Hamburg Hammerbrook